The Commonwealth System of Higher Education is a statutory designation by the Commonwealth of Pennsylvania that confers "state-related" status on four universities located within the state: Lincoln University, the Pennsylvania State University, Temple University, and the University of Pittsburgh.  The designation establishes the schools as an "instrumentality of the commonwealth" and provides each university with annual, non-preferred financial appropriations in exchange offering tuition discounts to students who are residents of Pennsylvania and a minority state-representation on each school's board of trustees. Legally, the universities remain separate and private entities, operating under their own charters, governed by independent boards of trustees, and with assets under their own ownership and control, thereby retaining much of the freedom and individuality of private institutions, both administratively and academically. It is the only public-private hybrid system of higher education of its particular type in the United States, although some other schools, such as Cornell University, the University of Delaware, and Rutgers University, all also have public-private partnerships of their own kind.

Because their annual state allocations account for less than 10% of their budgets, universities in the Commonwealth System tend to have higher tuition costs compared to the Pennsylvania State System of Higher Education which contains 10 state-owned and operated universities.  Because of their independence, universities in the Commonwealth System are exempt from Pennsylvania's Open Records law except for a few minor provisions.

History

Before the creation of the "state-related" legal status in the 1960s, Lincoln University, Temple University, and the University of Pittsburgh were fully private universities. Temple and Pitt were granted state-related status by acts of Commonwealth's legislature in 1965 and 1966, respectively. Lincoln University, a historically Black university, was designated as a state-related university in 1972.

Although the Pennsylvania State University (Penn State) was founded as a private school, it was later designated as the Commonwealth's sole land-grant institution. It was repeatedly defined as a "state-owned university" in numerous official acts and Pennsylvania Attorney General opinions from its creation as a land-grant, then named the Pennsylvania State College. It was thus eligible to have its road system and buildings on state campuses constructed using state funding, paying its employees through state-issued checks, and having them eligible to collect state employee retirement system benefits.

Penn State was already treated and referred to as a public state-related university by the Commonwealth, including receiving non-preferred appropriations, when the other three universities were designated as state-related institutions by the legislature.  In 1989, Penn State asserted a public status in court for the purpose of not having a private bank branch's operations on its University Park campus subject to local county taxes, while simultaneously asserting private status for the purpose of not having to reveal the salaries of its top administrative employees. With the enabling legislation changing the failing Williamsport (PA) Area Community College to the affiliated "Pennsylvania College of Technology" in 1989, Penn State was reaffirmed as a "state-related" institution.

Universities
The following universities (listed with their branch and regional campuses) are members of the Commonwealth System of Higher Education

Lincoln
Lincoln University, University City

Penn State
Pennsylvania State University, University Park, PA

Penn State Abington (4-year undergraduate)
Penn State Altoona (4-year undergraduate)
Penn State Beaver (4-year undergraduate)
Penn State Berks (4-year undergraduate)
Penn State Brandywine (4-year undergraduate)
Penn State DuBois (4-year undergraduate)
Penn State Dickinson, Carlisle (Graduate law)
Penn State Behrend (4-year undergraduate)

Penn State Fayette (4-year undergraduate)
Penn State Great Valley (Graduate)
Penn State Greater Allegheny (4-year undergraduate)
Penn State Harrisburg (4-year undergraduate and graduate)
Penn State Hazleton (4-year undergraduate)
Penn State Hershey (Graduate medical)
Penn State Lehigh Valley (4-year undergraduate)
Penn State Mont Alto (4-year undergraduate)

Penn State New Kensington  (4-year undergraduate)
Penn State Schuylkill (4-year undergraduate)
Penn State Shenango (4-year undergraduate)
Penn State Wilkes-Barre (4-year undergraduate)
Penn State Worthington Scranton (4-year undergraduate)
Penn State York (4-year undergraduate)
Pennsylvania College of Technology (Applied technical training)

Pittsburgh
University of Pittsburgh, Pittsburgh, PA
University of Pittsburgh at Bradford (4-year undergraduate and graduate)
University of Pittsburgh at Greensburg (4-year undergraduate)
University of Pittsburgh at Johnstown (4-year undergraduate)
University of Pittsburgh at Titusville (2-year undergraduate)

Temple
Temple University, Philadelphia, PA
Temple University Ambler (4-year undergraduate and graduate)
Temple University Fort Washington (Graduate)
Temple University Harrisburg (1-year undergraduate and graduate)
Temple University, Japan Campus (4-year undergraduate and graduate)

Rankings of universities

Endowment and research

Endowments (FY 2018*)

Research and Development Expenditures (FY 2017)

See also
 Statutory college, the private-public contractual system of higher education schools and colleges in New York State.

References

External links
State-Related Universities

 
Public university systems in the United States